Greenleaf Publishing is a UK-based publishing imprint specializing in corporate responsibility, business ethics, environmental policy and management, future business strategy and practice, and sustainable development. Founded in 1992 as an independent publisher, the company became part of GSE Research Limited, an online scholarly publisher specializing in governance, sustainability and the environment, in 2012. In 2017, the company was sold to Taylor & Francis and became part of its Routledge imprint.

Greenleaf has an existing catalogue of over 300 titles, including book series on stakeholder management, business education for sustainability, system innovation for sustainability, and responsible investment. The company also publishes academic journals, including: The Journal of Corporate Citizenship; The Journal of Applied Management and Entrepreneurship; The Journal of Sustainable Mobility; Business, Peace and Sustainable Development; Building Sustainable Legacies; and The Annual Review of Social Partnerships. In addition, Greenleaf offers online collections in the form of the Greenleaf Online Library (GOL) and the Sustainable Organization Library (SOL).

The company has collaborated with various international organizations working in the fields of sustainability and social responsibility. These include the Principles for Responsible Management Education (PRME)—an initiative of the United Nations Global Compact—along with the European Foundation for Management Development and others. Greenleaf is also a member of Business in the Community. 

Authors published by Greenleaf include Stephen O. Andersen, Mark Moody-Stuart, Stephan Schmidheiny, Paul Shrivastava, and Wayne Visser.

References

External links

1992 establishments in the United Kingdom
Environmental publishers
Publishing companies of the United Kingdom